Route 4370 or Eastern Ring Road, also known critically as the Apartheid road, is a highway that connects the Geva Binyamin Israeli-occupied settlement of the West Bank, and Jerusalem.

Access control lanes 
Separate lanes carry those who have a permit to enter Jerusalem and those who do not. The western lane is designed for people without a Jerusalem permit and does not pass through the Hizme check-point. The eastern lane is designed for those with a permit. Citizens of Israel can pass freely, while West Bank Palestinians require a permit from Israeli authorities. The two lanes are separated by an 8-meter tall concrete wall, topped with metal fencing. The road allows the residents of the Binyamins Region to enter Jerusalem with easier access to French Hill and Mount Scopus.

History 
Construction of the road began in 2005 and ended in 2017. Before its 9 January 2019 opening it was renovated by Moriah, the infrastructure company of the municipality of Jerusalem. The road was opened by Minister of Public Security Gilad Erdan; the head of the Binyamin Regional Council, Yisrael Gantz; and the Mayor of Jerusalem, Moshe Lion. While the West Bank hosts several highways with different lanes for Israelis and Palestinians, Route 4370 is the only one with a concrete wall spanning its length.

Erdan said the highway was "an example of the ability to create coexistence between Israelis and Palestinian while guarding (against) the existing security challenges," while the Palestinian Authority called Route 4370 an Apartheid Road and condemned the silence of the international community over its construction.

References 

Limited-access roads in Israel
Roads in Israel
Roads in Israeli-occupied territories